Trevor Gwandu (born 24 February 1998) is a Zimbabwean cricketer. He made his first-class debut for Mid West Rhinos in the 2017–18 Logan Cup on 10 October 2017. He made his List A debut for Mid West Rhinos in the 2017–18 Pro50 Championship on 1 December 2017. In December 2020, he was selected to play for the Rhinos in the 2020–21 Logan Cup.

References

External links
 

1998 births
Living people
Zimbabwean cricketers
Place of birth missing (living people)
Mid West Rhinos cricketers